Asen Dyakovski (born 20 August 1933) is a Bulgarian fencer. He competed in the individual foil and sabre events at the 1960 Summer Olympics.

References

1933 births
Living people
Bulgarian male foil fencers
Olympic fencers of Bulgaria
Fencers at the 1960 Summer Olympics
Sportspeople from Sofia
Bulgarian male sabre fencers